Alexandru Margină (born 8 March 1993) is a former Romanian professional footballer who played as a forward.

Honours
Ceahlăul Piatra Neamț
Liga II: 2010–11

References

External links
 
 

1993 births
Living people
People from Moinești
Romanian footballers
Association football forwards
Romania youth international footballers
CF Liberty Oradea players
FC Brașov (1936) players
Liga I players
Liga II players
CSM Ceahlăul Piatra Neamț players
FC Viitorul Constanța players